Portugal was represented by Tonicha, with the song "Menina do alto da serra", at the 1971 Eurovision Song Contest, which took place on 3 April in Dublin. "Menina do alto da serra" was chosen as the Portuguese entry at the Grande Prémio TV da Canção Portuguesa on 11 February.

Before Eurovision

Festival da Canção 1971
Nine songs took part in the final. Jorge Costa Pinto conducted all the songs. The results were determined by a distrital jury, composed by three members, each had 5 votes to be distributed among the songs it intended to award, making a total of 15 votes per district.

At Eurovision 
On the night of the final Tonicha performed 15th in the running order, following Netherlands and preceding Yugoslavia.

A new voting system was introduced for the 1971 contest, with two jury members from each country, split into six groups, appearing on screen to award between 1 and 5 points to each song other than that of their own nation. The Portuguese jury members were Pedro Albergaria and Luís Filipe Costa.

At the close of the voting the song had received 83 points, coming 9th in the field of 18 competing countries, at the time Portugal's highest Eurovision finish. The orchestra during the Portuguese entry was conducted by Jorge Costa Pinto.

Voting

References 

1971
Countries in the Eurovision Song Contest 1971
Eurovision